Anna Smith may refer to:

Ann Bedsole (born 1930 as Anna Smith), American politician
Anna Deavere Smith (born 1950), actress and academic
Anna Nicole Smith (1967–2007), model and actress
Anna Smith (cricketer) (born 1978), New Zealand cricketer
Anna Smith (tennis) (born 1988), British tennis player
Anna Smith (critic) (21st century), British film critic

See also
Anne Smith (disambiguation)
Annie Smith (disambiguation)